SICC may refer to:

 Sabah International Convention Centre, a convention center in Sabah, Malaysia
 Supreme Islamic Courts Council, the former name of Islamic Courts Union in Somalia